Mondavi may refer to:

 Robert Mondavi (1913–2008), vineyard operator in Napa Valley, California
 Peter Mondavi (1914–2016), American winemaker
 Margrit Mondavi (1925–2016), Swiss-born American businesswoman
 Mondavi Center, a performing arts venue on the UC Davis campus in Davis, California

See also
 Mondovi (disambiguation)